Todd Matthew Bouman (born August 1, 1972) is a former American football quarterback. He was signed by the Minnesota Vikings as an undrafted free agent in 1997. He played college football at St. Cloud State. Bouman also played for the New Orleans Saints, Green Bay Packers, Jacksonville Jaguars, St. Louis Rams and Baltimore Ravens.

Early years
Bouman was born in Ruthton, Minnesota, and attended Russell-Tyler-Ruthton High School (class of 1991) and was a letterman in football, basketball, and track & field. He won All-State honors in football and basketball, and in track & field, he qualified for the State Meet in both the long jump and the high jump, and led the basketball team to back-to-back State Championship appearances.

College career
Bouman initially attended South Dakota State University and transferred to St. Cloud State University in 1992. At St. Cloud State, Bouman lettered in football from 1993 to 1996. In his three years, he passed for 4,354 yards and completed 326 passes (including for 30 touchdowns). In his senior year, Bouman was an honorable mention All-North Central Conference selection. He earned his degree in sports sociology from St. Cloud State in 1997.

Professional career

Minnesota Vikings
Bouman signed as an undrafted free agent with the Minnesota Vikings in 1997. Bouman briefly replaced Daunte Culpepper as the Vikings starting quarterback toward the end of the 2001 NFL season after Culpepper was injured. In a game against the Tennessee Titans, Bouman completed 21 of 31 passes for 384 yards and four touchdowns and was named NFC Offensive Player of the Week. In 2002, Bouman took over again for Culpepper with the Vikings trailing the New York Giants 27–20 but could not complete a potential tying touchdown drive. After the game, Bouman expressed interest in becoming a starting quarterback.

New Orleans Saints
In 2003, the Vikings traded Bouman to the New Orleans Saints as a backup to Aaron Brooks. On December 14, 2005, after a loss on national television to the Falcons, the Saints benched Brooks and announced Bouman as the team's starter for the last three games of the season. The Saints lost all three games. Prior to the 2006 season, Bouman was released by the Saints in favor of Jamie Martin, who would back up newly signed starter Drew Brees.

Green Bay Packers
On November 21, 2006, Bouman signed with the Green Bay Packers to replace injured Aaron Rodgers as their second-string quarterback.

First stint with Jaguars
On October 25, 2007, Bouman was signed to a one-year deal by the Jacksonville Jaguars as a backup to Quinn Gray, who was starting in place of an injured David Garrard.

St. Louis Rams
Bouman then signed with the St. Louis Rams as insurance when starting quarterback Marc Bulger was out and backup Gus Frerotte went down.

Second stint with Jaguars
Bouman re-signed with the Jacksonville Jaguars in the 2008 offseason and attended training camp with the team. He was later released on August 30 during final cuts.

Baltimore Ravens
Bouman signed with the Baltimore Ravens on September 3, 2008, after quarterback Kyle Boller was placed on injured reserve. He was released by the team on November 1, only to be re-signed four days later.

Bouman was re-signed by the Ravens on March 31, 2009. The Ravens released him again on May 1 after signing quarterback John Beck.

Multiple stints with Jaguars
The Jacksonville Jaguars re-signed Bouman on May 4, 2009, following the release of undrafted rookie quarterback Nathan Brown.

He was re-signed for a fourth time on September 21, 2010, when the Jaguars placed Luke McCown on the injured reserve. On October 5, 2010, the Jaguars released Bouman. On October 19, Bouman was re-signed after injuries to David Garrard and Trent Edwards. Bouman started for the Jags against the Kansas City Chiefs on October 24. Bouman played well, throwing for 222 yards, and 2 touchdowns, however he also threw 2 interceptions. He was re-signed again by the Jaguars on December 17. Bouman was re-signed once more on August 9, 2011, due to a back injury to starter Garrard. He was released on August 29.

Coaching career
On March 19, 2014, the Buffalo-Hanover-Montrose School District in Minnesota announced Todd Bouman as the new head coach for the Buffalo High School program.

Personal life
Bouman and his wife, Courtney, have a daughter, Aivary, and a son, Aidan, who transferred to South Dakota after starting his college career with the Iowa State Cyclones.

References

1972 births
Living people
American football quarterbacks
Baltimore Ravens players
Barcelona Dragons players
Green Bay Packers players
Jacksonville Jaguars players
Minnesota Vikings players
New Orleans Saints players
People from Pipestone County, Minnesota
Players of American football from Minnesota
South Dakota State University alumni
St. Cloud State Huskies football players
St. Cloud State Huskies men's basketball players
St. Louis Rams players
American men's basketball players